Vrátna dolina or Vrátna Valley is a valley in the Malá Fatra mountain range in Slovakia. It is situated 3 kilometers from the village of Terchová in the Žilina Region. Vrátna dolina covers an area of approximately 36 km2 (13,9 mi2). There are four access points into the valley: Tiesňavy, Stará dolina, Nová dolina, and Starý dvor.

Tourism

Vrátna is one of the most visited tourist and ski destinations in Slovakia. The ski resort Vrátna is situated at altitudes from 600 to 1,550 m AMSL and offers 16 slopes. Since 2006, Vrátna offers a cable car Vrátna (740 m) - Chleb (1,490 m), using 8-seat gondolas. It also offers cross-country skiing and other winter activities, and biking and hiking trails.

References

External links
Vrátna Valley at Slovakia.travel
Vrátna Ski Resort at Slovakia.travel
Vrátna at Slovakiatourism.sk
Vrátna Free Time Zone resort

Ski areas and resorts in Slovakia
Western Carpathians